is a Japanese actor, singer, and model from Nagoya, Japan. When he was still in high school, he was discovered by a talent agent while out shopping with friends. He made his debut in the drama Am I Weird? (私ってへん？ Watashitte Hen?) in 1998. Tamaki became better known with his appearance in the 2001 film Waterboys.

His singing career started with the single "Seasons" in the summer of 2004.

He was cast as Shinichi Chiaki in the drama Nodame Cantabile, which aired in Japan on Fuji TV on 16 October 2006. The drama was a hit, and he became most known for this role.

He starred in the revival of the Iron Chef Japanese cooking show on Fuji TV in October 2012, portraying the chairman of the Kitchen Stadium.

He also lended his voice to dub Western productions; for example he voiced Owen Grady (played by Chris Pratt) in the Jurassic World film series and Alex the Lion (original voice: Ben Stiller) in the Madagascar animated film series.

Filmography

Films
 Christmas Eve (クリスマス・イヴ) (21 April 2000)
 Waterboys (15 September 2001)
 Sabu (さぶ) (5 October 2002)
 Gunjō no Yoru no Umōgire (群青の夜の羽毛布) (5 October 2002)
 Rockers (27 September 2003)
 Spirit (21 February 2004)
 Renai Shōsetsu (恋愛小説) (19 June 2004)
 Amemasu no Kawa: First Love (雨鱒の川-ファーストラブ) (13 November 2004)
 Ghost Shout (ゴーストシャウト) (18 December 2004)
 Nagurimono (23 September 2005)
 Henshin (変身) (19 November 2005)
 Heavenly Forest (28 October 2006)
 Midnight Eagle (23 November 2007)
 Smile Seiya no Kiseki (スマイル 聖夜の奇跡) (15 December 2007)
 Kids (2 February 2008)
 Nodame Cantabile – The Movie I and II (19 December 2009 and 17 April 2010)
 MW (4 July 2009)
 Ōoku (1 October 2010)
 Princess Toyotomi (28 May 2011)
 The Assassins (October 2012)
 It All Began When I Met You (2013)
 Time Trip App (2014) – Katsu Kaishū
 Bali Big Brother (2015)
 Detective Mitarai's Casebook: The Clockwork Current (2016)
 Love × Doc (2018)
 Evil and the Mask (2018)
 Laplace's Witch (2018)
 Aircraft Carrier Ibuki (2019) – Nariaki Seto
 Hokusai (2021) – Kitagawa Utamaro
 The Way of the Househusband: The Cinema (2022) – Tatsu
 The Good Father (2022)
 Kingdom 2: Far and Away (2022) – Lord Changping
 7 Secretaries: The Movie (2022) – Kōichi Ogata
 Black Night Parade (2022) – Knecht (voice)
 Kingdom 3 (2023) – Lord Changping

TV shows
 Great Teacher Onizuka (Fuji TV, 1998, guest)
 Tengoku ni Ichiban Chikai Otoko (TBS, 1999, guest)
 Abunai Hokago (TV Asahi, 1999, guest)
 Wakaresaseya (YTV, 2001, guest)
 Remote (NTV, 2002)
 Shopping Hero (TV Asahi, 2002)
 Boku ga Chikyu wo Suku (TBS, 2002)
 Water Boys (Fuji TV, 2003)
 Itoshi Kimi e (Fuji TV, 2004)
 Last Christmas (Fuji TV, 2004)
 Akai Unmei (TBS, 2005)
 Chibi Maruko-Chan (Fuji TV, 2006)
 Nodame Cantabile (Fuji TV, 2006)
 Top Caster (Fuji TV, 2006)
 Hyoheki (TBS, 2006)
 Kōmyō ga Tsuji (NHK, 2006) – Yamauchi Yasutoyo
 Teki wa Honnoji ni Ari (TV Asahi, 2007)
 Hoshi Hitotsu no Yoru (Fuji TV, 2007)
 Shikaotoko Aoniyoshi (Fuji TV, 2008)
 Atsuhime (NHK, 2008) – Sakamoto Ryōma
 Nodame Cantabile SP (Fuji TV, 2008)
 Love Shuffle (TBS, 2009)
 MW Dai-0-sho (NTV, 2009)
 Guilty Akuma to Keiyakushita Onna (Kansai TV, 2010)
 Iron Chef (Fuji TV, 2012)
 Taira no Kiyomori (NHK, 2012) – Minamoto no Yoshitomo
 Wonderful Single Life (Fuji TV, 2012)
 Watashi no Kirai na Tantei (TV Asahi, 2014)
 Kyō wa Kaisha Yasumimasu. (NTV, 2014)
 Zannen na Otto (Fuji TV, 2015)
 Here Comes Asa! (NHK, 2015) – Shinjiro Shiraoka
 Kyoaku wa Nemurasenai (TV Tokyo, 2016) – Tominaga
 Kyaria Okiteyaburi no Keisatsu Shocho (Fuji TV, 2016) – Kinshiro Toyama
 Anata niwa Kaeru Ie ga Aru / You have someone to come home to (TBS, 2018) – Sato Hideaki
 The Way of the Househusband (NTV, 2020) – Tatsu
 Reach Beyond the Blue Sky (NHK, 2021) – Takashima Shūhan
 Sakura no To (TV Asahi, 2021) - Ren Kamijo

TV films
 Ghost System (2002)
 Revolver Aoi Haru (July 2003)

Video games
 Rogue Galaxy (2005) – Jaster Rogue
 Lost Judgment (2021) – Kazuki Soma

Dubbing roles

Live-action
Jurassic World – Owen Grady (Chris Pratt)
Jurassic World: Fallen Kingdom – Owen Grady (Chris Pratt)
Jurassic World Dominion – Owen Grady (Chris Pratt)
Timeline – Chris Johnston (Paul Walker)

Animation
Madagascar – Alex the Lion
Madagascar: Escape 2 Africa – Alex the Lion
Madagascar 3: Europe's Most Wanted – Alex the Lion

Discography

Singles
 Seasons (Yoshimoto R&C, 2 June 2004)
 Emotion (Yoshimoto R&C, 10 November 2004)
 Love Goes/eyes (Avex Trax, 15 February 2006)
 Kibou no Umi/Ame (希望の海/雨 Sea of Desire/Rain) (Avex Trax, 26 April 2006)
 Yakusoku/question (約束/question Promise/Question) (Avex Trax, 24 May 2006)
 Reviver ~Kanashimi ga Mata Kurikaesou to Dareka ni Ai wo Utau~ (ラバイバー～悲しみがまた繰り返そうと誰かに愛を唄う～ Reviver ~When the Sadness Returns, Who Will I Sing my Love to? (Avex Trax, 28 June 2006)
 Odorou Yo (踊ろうよ Let's Dance (Avex Trax, 6 February 2008)
 Dakishimetai (抱きしめたい I Want to Hug You) (Avex Trax, 19 March 2008)
 Slow Time (Avex Trax, 22 April 2009)
 Free (Far Eastern Tribe, 25 May 2011)

Albums
 Ripple (Yoshimoto R&C, 15 December 2004)
 Bridge (Avex Trax, 19 March 2008)
 Times... (Avex Trax, 6 May 2009)
 Start (Far Eastern Tribe, 22 June 2011)

DVDs
 Secret of Tamaki Hiroshi "Spirit" (2004)
 "Realize" Hiroshi Tamaki music films 01 (30 June 2004)

References

External links

  
 Official Avex profile 
 Official UMG profile 

1980 births
Living people
Japanese male film actors
Japanese male pop singers
Japanese male television actors
Japanese male video game actors
Japanese male voice actors
People from Nagoya
Universal Music Japan artists
Avex Group artists
20th-century Japanese male actors
21st-century Japanese male actors
21st-century Japanese singers
21st-century Japanese male singers